Charles Richard Gardner (22 December 1913 - 1997) was an English footballer. His regular position was as an inside right. Born in Birmingham, Gardner played for Evesham Town, Notts County, Stourbridge, Sheffield United, and Manchester United.

References

External links
MUFCInfo.com profile

1913 births
1997 deaths
Date of death missing
Footballers from Birmingham, West Midlands
English footballers
Association football inside forwards
Notts County F.C. players
Stourbridge F.C. players
Manchester United F.C. players
Sheffield United F.C. players